An application launcher is a computer program that helps a user to locate and start other computer programs.  An application launcher provides shortcuts to computer programs, and stores the shortcuts in one place so they are easier to find.

In the comparison of desktop application launchers that follows, each section is devoted to a different desktop environment.

Android

Windows 
These desktop application launchers work with Microsoft Windows operating systems only.

Linux 
These desktop application launchers work with Linux operating systems only.

macOS 
These desktop application launchers work with the Apple macOS operating system only.

Cross platform 
These desktop application launchers work with two or more different operating systems.

See also
 List of dock applications
 Novell ZENworks, software formerly named (and still informally termed) "Novell Application Launcher"

References

External links
 John Emmatty (November 2011) A Mouse Free Approach For Working With Your System. 
  Anke Anlauf (14 January 2010), Schmucke PC-Docks wie auf dem Mac (roundup of MS Windows launchers), Softonic OnSoftware
 Peter (October 15, 2008) The State of Linux Docks, linuxhaxor.net
 jdeslip (June 25, 2009) The Best Docks on the Linux Coast, Berkeley Linux Users Group
 Raymond (June 2016) 3 Application Launchers with Automated Portable Software Installation System, Raymond.cc computers, made easy

Application launchers